Trufultruful River (also spelled Truful-Truful) is a river located in the La Araucanía Region of Chile. It flows south a few kilometres from its source, the Laguna Verde, to join the Zahuelhue River, forming the Allipén River at Melipeuco. A great part of its course is contained within Conguillío National Park and drains the east slope of Llaima volcano. Truful-Truful Falls occurs on the river.

References

External links 
 Trufultruful River website of exchile.com/

Rivers of Araucanía Region
Rivers of Chile